Palazzo Salvadori is a palazzo in Trento, northern Italy, one of the first examples of Renaissance civil architecture in the city.

History
It was built by the Lombard master Lucio Tosani, during the reign of Prince-Bishop Bernardo Clesio, starting in 1515. Designed by the architect Lucio Tosani, the building is placed on the foundation of the old synagogue of the small Jewish community present in the city. For a long time belonged to the family of Trautmannsdorf, now the building presentes two main doors on which there are still two medallions, dating from the first half of the eighteenth century, painted by Francesco Oradini; representing the supposed martyrdom of the child Simonino from Trento. The child was alleged to be the victim of a Jewish ritual murder during the Easter of 1475. In the aftermath of the child's death, 15 Jews were blamed and burnt at the stake, and the remaining Jewish families of Trento were expelled. Simonino was venerated as Blessed until 1965, but after the second Vatican council the worship was banned. Around the mid-18th century above the two portals were placed the marble reliefs by Francesco Oradini depicting the purported martyrdom of the child Simone (Simon of Trent).  This boy was the alleged ritual victim of Jewish residents of Trento on Easter 1475.

References

External links

Antisemitism in Italy
Buildings and structures in Trento
Salvadori
Renaissance architecture in Trentino-Alto Adige/Südtirol